The Roman Catholic Archdiocese of Korhogo is the Metropolitan See for the Ecclesiastical province of Korhogo in Côte d'Ivoire.

History
 1911.11.17: Established as Apostolic Prefecture of Korhogo from the Apostolic Prefecture of Costa d'Avorio
 1952.05.15: Suppressed to the Apostolic Vicariate of Katiola
 1971.10.15: Restored as Diocese of Korhogo from the Diocese of Katiola 
 1994.12.19: Promoted as Metropolitan Archdiocese of Korhogo

Special churches
The seat of the archbishop is the Cathedral of Saint John the Baptist. The сhurch conducts educational programs and meetings with high-ranking guests from the Catholic Church, including archbishop Joseph Spiteri.

Bishops

Ordinaries, in reverse chronological order
 Metropolitan Archbishops of Korhogo (Roman rite), below
 Archbishop Ignace Bessi Dogbo (2021.01.03 -
 Archbishop Marie-Daniel Dadiet (2004.05.12 - 2017.10.12)
 Archbishop Auguste Nobou (1994.12.19 – 2003.09.25); see below
 Bishop of Korhogo (Roman rite), below
 Bishop Auguste Nobou (1971.10.15 – 1994.12.19); see above
 Prefects Apostolic of Korhogo (Roman rite), below.  In 1952, this jurisdiction was changed from prefecture apostolic of Korhogo to vicariate apostolic of Katiola (Father Durrheimer becoming a titular Bishop and continuing as Ordinary), and then became a diocese in 1955.  (The Korhogo name was revived in 1971 in a diocese name, and became a metropolitan archdiocese in 1994 with Katiola as one of its suffragans.)
 Fr. Emile Durrheimer, S.M.A. (1947.10.17 – 1952.05.15), appointed titular Bishop and Vicar Apostolic of Katiola
 Fr. Louis Wach, S.M.A. (1940.02.09 – 1947)
 Fr. Joseph Diss, S.M.A. (1921.07.08 – 1938)
 Fr. Pietro Maria Kernivinen, S.M.A. (1911 – 1921)

Auxiliary bishop
Marie-Daniel Dadiet (1998-2002), appointed Bishop of Katiola (later returned here as Archbishop)

Suffragan Dioceses
 Katiola
 Odienné

See also
 Roman Catholicism in Côte d'Ivoire
 List of Roman Catholic dioceses in Côte d'Ivoire

References

Sources
 GCatholic.org

Korhogo
Savanes District
Korhogo
A